The 2011 IAAF Hammer Throw Challenge was the second edition of the annual, global series of hammer throw competitions organised by the International Association of Athletics Federations. The winners were Krisztián Pars of Hungary (239.03 metres) and Betty Heidler of Germany (228.09 metres). Heidler retained her title from 2010, making her the first athlete to win the series twice. Both the final scores were records for the challenge.

A total of nine meetings featured on the circuit, with six women's and seven men's contests spread across those events. The point scoring format was cumulative – the final standings were decided by the sum of athletes' three best throws on the circuit. Only the best throw by an athlete from each meet was taken into consideration.

Calendar
Roughly contiguous with the IAAF World Challenge circuit, a permit hammer throw event was held at nine of the fourteen meetings of that circuit.

Final standings

Men
A total of twelve men recorded valid marks at three meetings and made the final standings.

Women
A total of nine women recorded valid marks at three meetings and made the final standings.

References

2011
IAAF Hammer Throw Challenge